Heracleopolis Magna (Megálē Herakléous pólis) and Heracleopolis (Herakleópolis) and Herakleoupolis, is the Roman name of the capital of the 20th nome of ancient Upper Egypt, known in Ancient Egyptian as .

Name

In Ancient Egypt, Heracleopolis Magna was called , meaning Child of the King (appearing as hnn nswt or hwt nn nswt; also transcribed Henen-Nesut or Hut-Nen-Nesut). This later developed into , which was borrowed into early  Ahnās. The site is now known as Ihnasiyyah Umm al-Kimam "Ihnasiyyah, Mother of the Shards" and as Ihnasiyyah al-Madinah "The City of Ihnasiyyah".

The Greek name meant "City of Heracles", with the epithet "great" being added to distinguish it from other towns with that name. The Greek form became more common during the Ptolemaic Kingdom, who came to power after the death of Alexander the Great. The Roman Empire used a Latinised form of the Greek name.

History

Early Dynastic Period
The date of the earliest settlements on the site of Herakleopolis is not known, but an entry on the Palermo Stone reporting king Den's visit to the sacred lake of Heryshef at Nenj-neswt, the ancient name of the city, suggests that it was already in existence by the mid First Dynasty, c. 2970 BC.

First Intermediate Period (2181–2055 BC)

Herakleopolis first came to prominence and reached its apogee of power during the First Intermediate Period, between 2181 and 2055 BC.  Eventually after the collapse of the Old Kingdom, Egypt was divided into Upper and Lower Egypt. Herakleopolis became the principal city of Lower Egypt and was able to exercise its control over much of the region.  Herakleopolis exerted such great control over Lower Egypt during this time that Egyptologists and Egyptian archaeologists sometimes refer to the period between the 9th and 10th Dynasties (2160–2025 BC) as the Herakleopolitan Period.  During this period, Herakleopolis often found itself in conflict with the de facto capital of Upper Egypt, ancient Thebes.

Middle Kingdom (2055–1650 BC)

Between the latter part of the First Intermediate Period and the early Middle Kingdom, the city became the religious center of the cult of Heryshaf, and the Temple of Heryshaf was constructed.  Heracleopolis Magna and its dynasty was defeated by Mentuhotep II in c. 2055–2004 BC, which ushered in the Middle Kingdom period.

Third Intermediate Period (1069–664 BC)

By the time of the Third Intermediate Period (1069–664 BC), Herakleopolis again rose in importance.  There were many renovations and new constructions of the temple and mortuary centers that existed in the city, and it again became an important religious and political center.

Ptolemaic Egypt (322–30 BC)

By the Ptolemaic Kingdom (332–30 BC), Herakleopolis was still an important religious and cultural center in Egypt. The Greek rulers of this period, in an attempt to find connections and comparisons between their own gods and the gods of the land that they were now ruling, associated Haryshef with Heracles in the interpretatio graeca, thus the name often used by modern scholars for Herakleopolis.

Roman Egypt (30 BC–390 AD)

The site of Herakleopolis was occupied even into Roman times. Near the Necropolis of Sedmet el-Gebel, houses dating to this period were found, which in and of itself implies a continued occupation of the area.

Notable people
 Theophanes (Θεοφάνης), a Physicist.

Archaeological excavations

Sir Flinders Petrie and Edouard Naville

The first person to undertake an extensive excavation at Herakleopolis was the Swiss Egyptologist Edouard Naville. After excavating what he believed to be the entirety of the Temple of Heryshef, Naville came to the conclusion that he had found all that Herakleopolis had to offer.

His friend Sir Flinders Petrie, on the other hand, “...in 1879 suspected that the region already cleared was only a part of the temple,” and thus Herakleopolis (or Ehnasya as he called it, a name harking back to the site's period of Roman occupation) had much left to be unearthed.

Petrie discovered a great deal that Naville had not believed existed. He completed the excavation of the temple of Heryshef, and attempted to find other remains in an area around the temple. In so doing, he succeeded in discovering such previously unknown features. such as a house's remains from the Roman period of occupation. He also identified another temple that he attributed to the 19th Dynasty, as well as the aforementioned additions to the Temple of Heryshef associated with Ramesses the Great. Other than archaeological features, the artefacts found by Petrie during his excavation are numerous, and span the entire chronological range of settlement.  Relating specifically to artefacts found from the end of the First Intermediate Period and the beginning of the Middle Kingdom, Petrie uncovered numerous pot sherds he associated with the 11th Dynasty. From the later Roman periods, Petrie found numerous objects associated with many of the mortuary sites that he unearthed, including iron tools, pottery, and icons.

Recent excavations
While other excavations are not numerous and are naturally overshadowed by that of Flinders Petrie and his famous expedition, there have been several more recent excavations that have also increased knowledge of the site. During the 1980s, a Spanish team conducted excavations and uncovered such artefacts as a libation altar and a pair of decorated eyes, presumably from a statue, all attributed to a temple dated to the Third Intermediate Period.

A Spanish team also conducted excavations as recently as 2008, under the direction of María del Carmen Pérez-Die of the National Archaeological Museum in Madrid, Spain. Their efforts revealed a previously unknown tomb with several false doors dating to the First Intermediate Period, as well as funeral offerings, all of which had not been vandalized.
Other finds include the funeral chapel of senior official Neferjau and his wife Sat-Bahetep, and the remains of tomb H.1 belonging to a late-11th Dynasty officier named Khety.

References

External links
 Pleiades ID: https://pleiades.stoa.org/places/736920

Populated places established in the 3rd millennium BC
Populated places disestablished in the 1st millennium
Cities in ancient Egypt
Archaeological sites in Egypt
Beni Suef Governorate
22nd century BC in Egypt
21st century BC in Egypt
Ninth Dynasty of Egypt
Tenth Dynasty of Egypt
Former populated places in Egypt
Former capitals of Egypt